30 Arietis (abbreviated 30 Ari) is a 6th-apparent-magnitude multiple star system in the constellation of Aries. 30 Arietis is the Flamsteed designation. 30 Arietis A and B are separated by  or about  at a distance of 130 light years away. The main components of both systems are both binaries with a composite spectra belonging to F-type main-sequence stars, meaning they are fusing hydrogen in their cores. The 30 Arietis system is 910 million years old, one fifth the age of the Sun.

Star system
30 Arietis A and B are separated by 38.1", corresponding to 1,500 AU at a distance of 130 light years.  The pair are at almost the same distance, have very similar proper motions, and are considered almost certain to be gravitationally bound with a likely period around 34,000 years.  The main components of both systems are both binaries with a composite spectra belonging to F-type main-sequence stars, meaning they are fusing hydrogen in their cores.

30 Arietis A is a spectroscopic binary with an orbital period of 1.1 days.  The primary Aa is an F-type main sequence star about 31% more massive than the Sun, while the companion Ab is a faint red dwarf only about 15% the mass of the Sun.

In 2020, after the inclination of the planetary orbit was measured, the "planet" was found to fall in the mass range of a brown or red dwarf. The more distant companion was referred to as C to distinguish it from Bb, and at about 0.5" it has been imaged using adaptive optics.

30 Arietis Bb 

30 Arietis Bb (sometimes abbreviated 30 Ari Bb) is a red dwarf which orbits the F-type main sequence star 30 Arietis Ba, located in a quintuple star system approximately 146 light years away in the constellation Aries. The red dwarf was discovered by on Friday, November 27, 2009 by using precise radial velocity method from echelle spectrograph installed in the Alfred-Jensch telescope in Karl Schwarzschild Observatory. The star had a minimum mass of nearly 10 times that of Jupiter. In 2020, after the inclination of the planetary orbit was measured to be just 4.14°, the "planet" was found to fall in the mass range of red dwarf stars.

See also 

 HD 114762 b
 HD 114762

References

External links
 Image 30 Arietis
 Double stars
 NASA diagram of the 30 Ari System

Aries (constellation)
F-type main-sequence stars
5
Arietis, 30
Arietis, 30
0764/5
016232/46
BD+24 0375
012184/9
M-type main-sequence stars